The Superannuated Commonwealth Officer's Association (SCOA) was founded in New South Wales, Australia in 1923 to represent the interests of employees and superannuants (retirees) and their families from the Australian Commonwealth and Territory public sectors. SCOA is a non-political, not-for-profit organisation with members of branches in most states and territories as well as SCOA Australia, which was formed in 2013 to accommodate members in Queensland and South Australia when branches there closed down.  Potential members in the Northern Territory may join any branch or SCOA Australia.

Membership
Eligible members of SCOA are employees contributing to, former employees with preserved benefits in, or retirees receiving benefits from Commonwealth superannuation schemes, including the Commonwealth Superannuation Scheme (CSS), Public Sector Superannuation Scheme (PSS), Public Sector Superannuation Accumulation Plan (PSSAp) and lump-sum plans. Federal Conferences held twice yearly to determine SCOA policy and strategy. Each state is represented by a councillor from that state. State-branch executive committees provide support for members within each state. A Federal executive, based in Canberra, carries out the day-to-day activities of the organisation. A quarterly national newsletter, SuperTime, is sent to all members and most local branches publish a newsletter concerning local issues.

References

Australian veterans' organisations